Canberra White Eagles FC (commonly known simply as White Eagles) is an Australian amateur association football club based in the Woden Valley region of Canberra, Australian Capital Territory. Founded in 1992 by the Canberra Serbian community, the club currently competes in the Capital Premier League competition.

History

The Beginning
The club was officially formed in 1992.  Previously a number of Serbian teams existed but only for short spells, including the likes of Farrer United, Mawson Serbia and most recently Canberra United which ceased in 1990.
In 1993 the club entered the local league with teams in State League 2 and State League 4, with State 4 being the reserve team.  The squads had a good mix of experience, flair, discipline and enthusiasm.  Both teams won their respective competitions that season with results such as 9–1 common.  The club was successful in gaining promotion to State League 1 and State League 2.
The following year the senior team brought more success to the club winning the State League 1 competition.  The blend of youth and experience worked well.  The Reserves did not fare as well but nevertheless still had a successful year.
As time passed the playing careers of the senior players ended and together with some unexpected departures the senior team became a junior team overnight.  For the next few years both teams could not match the success of the past.  However, it was a valuable learning experience as the current success is due largely to the core group of players that battled on with the club during those lean years.

2000
In 2000 club officials hired an Argentine coach and he immediately brought success.  This was mainly due to the other players that he attracted to the club such as Gus Cerro (former NSL player).  The club again won the competition but due to the ever-changing rules of the governing body the club was denied entry to the ACT Premier League.  The team basically fell apart again, apart from that same core group of players that existed previously.
The next couple of years the club walked the tightrope, at times struggling both on and off the field.  Thankfully the core group of players remained committed.  In 2003 that core group of players reached their pinnacle and won the Grand Final against the odds, particularly so because it was against our fierce rivals.  The team came back from 1–0 down to win 2–1, some say the sweetest victory the club has achieved, proving that the core group of once youthful players had come of age.

2004 – Today
In 2004 the team produced the best season ever as they completed the season undefeated, winning both the League title and the Grand Final and thus finally gaining promotion to the Premier League.
Life in the Premier League was always going to be a challenge but not one that the Club was afraid of.  In the first year of Premier League football the club surprised many of the well established teams throughout the season.  The team finished only a few points away from the top four.
The second season (2006) was strangely, a greater challenge than the first.  Several experienced players left the club as they pursued other personal challenges.  These players were difficult to replace, particularly for the defence.  The club also had to allow for players under the age of 20 as per regulations, so the Premier League team was significantly more inexperienced than the team from the previous season.  The team struggled but the season was extremely valuable for the next generation of players.
During 2006 Capital Football undertook a review of the Premier League with a view to restructuring the competition.  The competition was dissolved so no clubs remained part of the Premier League.  All the Premier League clubs and some Division 1 clubs were invited to apply for the new competition.  For clubs to do so they were required to submit a 3-year Business Plan outlining for financial administration and technical development of players.
Unfortunately the Premier League experience ends there as Capital Football moved the goal posts, again.  The White Eagles were unsuccessful in retaining their position for the premier league as the Club did not have a sufficient junior base which was one of the requirements that Capital Football initiated.
Club officials quickly moved to rectify the issue by forming a relationship with a junior club.  An appeal was submitted to Capital Football addressing the issue but Capital Football, despite acknowledging that the issue had been addressed successfully, still denied the club a place in the Premier League and suggested that the clubs maintain their relationship and be prepared to apply for the Premier League in the future.
Regardless of the setback of Premier League non-acceptance the Club fought on and produced another successful season by winning the 2007 Division 1 Championship, the club's 3rd Championship in 5 years.
The team repeated the feat the following season in 2008 winning yet another all-to-familiar State League 1 title.
They were also Minor Premiers in 2009 where they lost to Cooma in the final and in 2010 before losing the Grand Final to Queanbeyan FC 1–0.

2011 –
The reserve grade side surprised many people and made their first final for quite some time, on the day they were out played by ANU 1–0 but put in a solid performance.

The first team for White Eagles FC won the Minor Premiership in 2011, losing only one game in round 2 of the season to bitter rivals O'Connor knights. The grand final was a one sided affair with the eagles beating ANU 5–1.

Season 2012 saw a new coach take charge, preseason showed some very exciting results with the team beating premier league side Woden Valley 6–1 in the federation cup. The season was a historic one for WEFC, going through undefeated winning the minor premiership and the grand final thanks to a super goal in extra time.

2013 – The team showed their dominance yet again during the season, a classic performance in round 2 beating QBN city 7–0 and wrapping up the title with weeks to spare. The season finished in disappointing fashion with the team being knocked out in the semi-finals, not being a part of the grand final for the first time since being relegated from the premier league.

2014 saw a big transition at the club, a lot of familiar faces chose to test their skills in the premier league and a few retiring from football. It was a tough year that tested the strength and character of the club, with the resources available the team punched above their weight and unfortunately lost the last game of the season which would have delivered yet another title.

2015 the club recruited and many new faces came to the club. It took a while or the team to gel and in the end the team finished a disappointing 4th. The club had a good finals series, beating Tuggeranong 4–0 in the minor semi, than demolishing the minor premiers Monaro 6–0 to earn a spot in the grand final. The final was contested between WEFC and ANU, eagles took the lead towards the end of the first half. Midway through the 2nd half ANU equalised and that was the way it finished up, in the shoot out ANU held their nerve and won the grand final.

2016 was a roller coaster ride for the club, it took a while for the club to finalise their squad and preseason started later than usual. Once the season began things looked great, winning our first 5 with some impressive performances. The first loss was to QBN city 4–2 but we had our revenge 4 days later in the FFA cup beating them in front of a big crowd 5–0. The skinny squad battled injuries and suspensions throughout the year. Finishing in 2nd position behind ANU was a fair reflection of how the season panned out.

2017 Capital League
2017 turned out to be a very disappointing season for the Canberra White Eagles; with the club finishing 5th and failing to make the finals for the first time since stepping back from the premier league; it was perhaps the wake up call the club had needed after falling off the pace in recent history

2018 ACT Capital League
Zoran Milenkovic returned to the head coaching role and the club brought in some new players to help freshen things up. Huss Fureje going from Tigers FC, Nik Noveski coming from Woden Weston and former Joey's player Vuk Vucic. The team came so close to winning the premiership; finishing with 38 points; 1 point behind eventual premiers QBN on 39. The eagles got their revenge on QBN; beating them 3-2 in the major semi final in a classic; Zinelabiddine Eljammoudi scoring a hat trick to send WEFC into the Grand Final. The GF did not turn out how we had hoped; ANU were the better team on the day and took it out convincingly.

2019 Inaugural NP2 Premiers
The Club appointed Graeme Plath as head coach, the first time the club had gone external in over a decade. Plath brought in a wealth of coaching and managerial experience as well as bringing in some new quality players such as Callum Beaton, Caleb Cullen-Rua, Ashley Collins, Tom Hewitt, Daniel Hately and David Kemp. 

The Eagles started the season winning their first 5 games. Followed by a 2-2 draw with Queanbeyan and a 0-1 loss to old rivals O'Connor Knights. The team regained momentum winning 5 from their next 6 before dropping points to Queanbeyan again. WEFC had thought they had let the title slip, after a dominating performance away to O'Connor; leading 2-0 with ten minutes to spare the eagles conceded two late goals to draw 2-2 and thus leave the title out of their hands.

The last game of the season saw WEFC win convincingly against Brindabella 6-1 on the clubs Family Day; White eagles needed O'Connor to take points off ANU for them have a chance of winning the title. The news came in that O'Connor had won 2-0 which meant WEFC won the title on goal difference. The first premiership since 2013. 

The club had a disappointing finals series that saw WEFC knocked out in the semi finals; but definitely a solid season and one everyone involved can be proud of

Current squad

Honours
ACT Capital League Premiers and Finals Champions.
NPL2 ACT/Capital Premier LeaguePremiers (7): 1994, 2004, 2009, 2010, 2011, 2012, 2013, 2019
Runner-up (2): 2014, 2016Champions (7): 2003, 2004, 2007, 2008, 2009, 2011, 2012
Runner-up (2): 2010, 2015ACT State League 2.Champions (1): 1993ACT State League 4.Champions (1):''' 1993

Season-by-season results

The below table is updated with the statistics and final results for White Eagles FC following the conclusion of each ACT Capital League season.

Gallery

References

External links
 Official Website
 Capital Football home

Serbian sports clubs in Australia
Association football clubs established in 1992
Soccer clubs in Canberra
1992 establishments in Australia